Tlapallite is a rare and complex tellurate mineral with the chemical formula . It has a Moh's hardness of 3 and it is green in colour. It was named after the Nahua word "Tlalpalli", which translates to paint, referring to the paint-like habit of the mineral. Its formula and crystal structure were redefined in 2019, showing it contained a mixed-valence phyllotellurate layer .

Occurrence 
It was discovered in 1972 the Bambollita mine (La Oriental), Moctezuma, Municipio de Moctezuma, Sonora, Mexico, a mine known for its tellurium deposits, and it was approved by the IMA in 1977. Here, it is found as thin paint-like crusts on rock fractures and next to thin veins running through rhyolite. It is often found as a thin film on quartz, sericite, calcite or baryte, but it also forms botryoidal aggregates. It is often found alone, but may be associated with other minerals, especially carlfriesite. It has also been found in the emerald mine in Tombstone District, Cochise County, Arizona in the United States.

The habit of the mineral suggests it precipitates from rapidly drying acid solutions. It seems to form in the transitory phase when other tellurium minerals, like tlalocite, cesbronite, xocomecatlite, quetzalcoatlite, teineite and carlfriesite, start to break down.

See also 
 List of minerals

References 

Copper(II) minerals
Sulfate minerals
Lead minerals
Tellurate mineral
Zinc minerals
Calcium minerals
Tellurite and selenite minerals